Xining Metro is a rapid transit system under planning in Xining, Qinghai. The vision for the Xining Metro includes three metro lines totaling , and a four-line,  suburban rail network, in the completed regional rapid transit network. A total of seven lines are proposed.

Line 1 and the first stage of Line 3 will cost about 28 billion yuan.

Line 1

Line 2

Line 3

References

Rapid transit in China
Transport in Qinghai
Proposed rapid transit